The 1950 Nottingham Trophy was a non-championship Formula One motor race held on 7 August 1950 at the Retford Gamston Airport, in Retford, Nottinghamshire, England.

Classification

Race

References

Nottingham Trophy
Nottingham Trophy
Auto races in the United Kingdom